The estuary perch (Macquaria colonorum) is a species of temperate perch endemic to south-eastern Australia, where it prefers brackish waters such as lower tidal reaches of coastal lakes, rivers, and streams.

Appearance

Reproduction
Estuary perch breed in winter at the same time as Australian bass, and are similarly sexually dimorphic, with females larger than males. Females reach sexual maturity at older ages and larger sizes than males. In Victoria, estuary perch/Australian bass hybrids are regularly recorded; most hybrids appear to be reproductively viable.

Spawning occurs at the mouths of estuaries, rivers, and streams during winter and spring when water temperatures are 14-19 °C.  In New South Wales, this occurs from July to August, while in the western regions of Victorian waters this happens from November to December.

They hatch into larvae after 2–3 days.

Age
Estuary perch, as also many other native fish of southeast Australia, are very long-lived. Longevity is a survival strategy to ensure that most adults participate in at least one exceptional spawning and recruitment event, which are often linked to unusually wet La Niña years and may only occur every one or two decades.  Maximum recorded age is 41 years.

Fishing
The estuary perch is a popular angling game fish in the states of Victoria (particularly) and New South Wales. The fish was once caught commercially with seine nets during their winter spawning migrations.  However, recently declining numbers mean the species is now protected from commercial fishing and bag limits occasionally apply on recreational fishing.

References

 

estuary perch
Freshwater fish of Australia
estuary perch
estuary perch
Taxobox binomials not recognized by IUCN